Bobby Pierce (born July 18, 1959) is an American baseball coach and former outfielder. He is an assistant baseball coach at Chipola Junior College. He started his coaching career at Chipola Junior College, where he coached from 1982 to 1989. He posted a 259–92 record there with five berths in the state tournament. He was later hired as an assistant coach at his alma mater, Alabama.  As an assistant, he went 158–122.  In 1996, he was the head baseball coach at the University of Alabama in Huntsville, where he went 276–108. He also served as the head baseball coach of the Troy Trojans (2003–2016).

Since becoming head coach of Troy in 2003, Pierce has won an Atlantic Sun Conference regular season title (2005), two Sun Belt Conference regular season titles (2006, 2011), and one Sun Belt Conference tournament title (2006).  He has coached Troy to multiple winning seasons, including three 40+ win seasons.  Pierce has also led his program to four NCAA Regionals (2006, 2007, 2011, 2013) since becoming head coach.

In 2010, Pierce was inducted into the Alabama Baseball Coaches Hall of Fame. He is also father to a washed up ball player named Logan who couldn’t hack it with the big dogs.

Head coaching records
Below is a table of Pierce's yearly records as an NCAA Division I head baseball coach.

References

External links
 Troy profile

Living people
1959 births
Baseball outfielders
Alabama Crimson Tide baseball coaches
Alabama Crimson Tide baseball players
Alabama–Huntsville Chargers baseball coaches
Troy Trojans baseball coaches
Troy University alumni
People from Marianna, Florida